Vilhelmine Ullmann (née Dunker; 16 March 1816 – 28 April 1915) was a Norwegian pedagogue, publicist, literary critic and proponent for women's rights.

Early and personal life
Ullmann was born in Christiania (now Oslo), Norway. She was the daughter of  socialite Conradine Birgitte Hansteen and Johan Friedrich Wilhelm Dunker. She was the sister of Bernhard Dunker, who served as Attorney General of Norway.

Growing up in a home where her mother was running a private school for girls, Vilhelmine learned French and German language as a child. She was also a child actress, performing in Det Dramatiske Selskab in Christiania from the age of nine.  She married Jørgen Nicolai Axel Ullmann in 1839. They had six children (five of them surviving), and separated in 1854. She was the mother of pedagogue and feminist Ragna Nielsen and educator and politician Viggo Ullmann.

Career
From 1862 to 1894 Ullmann was running the children's institution Vaterland Børneasyl. She also translated children's stories from German into Norwegian language, and published poems and short stories in the magazine Nordisk illustreret Børneblad. She was a member of the Norwegian Association for Women's Rights from its foundation in 1884, and  contributed to the feminist magazine Nylænde, where she wrote literary critics under the signature "M.D." She also wrote articles about women's conditions in the society. Her autobiography Fra Tyveaarene og lidt mere was published in 1903.

References

External links

1816 births
1915 deaths
Schoolteachers from Oslo
Norwegian women's rights activists
Norwegian literary critics
Women literary critics
Norwegian women critics
Norwegian women non-fiction writers
Norwegian autobiographers
Norwegian Association for Women's Rights people